Darrell Michael Smith (born June 22, 1971) is an American actor, producer and entrepreneur.  He is an actor who identifies with characters defined by their grace, dignity, humanity, and inner strength.

Early life 
 Darrell Smith was raised in Baltimore, MD and attended elementary at The Montessori School in Green-Spring Valley. He later attended Roland Park Middle School and Woodlawn High School. While at Woodlawn, Smith was an outstanding player on the varsity football team. In addition to sports, he was a graffiti artist, painter, and studied art at The Baltimore Museum of Art on weekends. In his last year of high school, Smith moved to Washington, D.C. and ended up graduating from Woodrow Wilson High School. After graduating, Smith continued his academic career at Norfolk State University and studied Political Science and communications.

Career
Darrell M. Smith is all American actor. Smith begin his career with The Negro Ensemble in New York City by doing off-Broadway plays under the direction of the late artistic director Charles Weldon. Smith transitioned to film was when he exec. produced and produced High’s & Lows with Justin Bartha (National Treasure, Failure To Launch, The HangOver Franchise) who wrote, directed and produced it as his thesis film while at NYU. Smith also played a bit part as a bartender in this eccentric comedy that went on to win awards at The Slamdance Film Festival. The film was shot on location in and around lower Manhattan, New York post 9/11, which allowed to provide film work for crew members. Smith then wrote, produced, directed, and starred in his first leading film role as “Devon“ in his own short film called One More Chance  which was shoot on location in Fort Greene in Brooklyn, New York. The film  got nominated for  "Best Film“ at The Gotham Short Film Festival Awards in New York but did not win. Smith also wrote, produced, and directed a short story called Meeting Mr. Kenny based on former Roc-A-Fella Records executive and music executive Kenny Burns that was showcased at The Heineken Film Festival with Kenny Burns. The film was shot and covered in Atlanta, GA by Creative Loafing Magazine. Then Smith went on the play School officer Turner on the most critically acclaimed TV drama of the 21st century HBO’s The Wire which was written by David Simon and Ed Burns. Smith has also appeared on The Dr. Oz Show regarding breast cancer awareness with Dr. Oz.

Other Endeavors 
In 2017 Darrell M. Smith co-founded We Are Throne, Inc., a company that is based in SoHo, Manhattan. The company's mission is to tell impactful stories through media, film and technology.

References
Written by Darrell M. Smith 

Creative Loafing Magazine "Meeting Mr. Kenny" Kenny Burns 2006

Hamptons Journal "Actor Darrell M.Smith loves the Hamptons" 2008

Screen Actors Guild

Justin Bartha wiki and website

References

External links
Darrell M. Smith official site

1973 births
Living people
Stella Adler Studio of Acting alumni
American male stage actors
American male television actors
Male actors from New York City